Jarno Tenkula (born 16 June 1982) is a Finnish football player currently playing for RoPS; he formerly played for OLS, TP-47, VPS and AC Oulu.

External links
  at rops.fi
  at veikkausliiga.com

References

1982 births
Living people
Finnish footballers
Association football forwards
Veikkausliiga players
Vaasan Palloseura players
AC Oulu players
Rovaniemen Palloseura players
Sportspeople from Oulu
TP-47 players
Oulun Luistinseura players